Reid A. Strain Torres (born January 19, 1994) is a Puerto Rican football player who currently plays as a forward for Friska Viljor.

Career statistics

Club

Notes

International

References

External links
 Reid Strain at the University of Indianapolis

1994 births
Living people
American soccer players
Puerto Rican footballers
Puerto Rican expatriate footballers
Puerto Rico international footballers
Association football forwards
Friska Viljor FC players
Expatriate footballers in Costa Rica
Expatriate footballers in Sweden
People from Barrington, Illinois
Sportspeople from the Chicago metropolitan area
Soccer players from Illinois